White Oak Hall, also known as White Oak School, is a historic building located near Rushville, Illinois, United States. The two-story school was built in 1874. The first floor of the building held the schoolroom, while the second floor was used as a meeting hall by the local chapter of The Grange. The Grange Hall also housed the White Oak Literary Society, church services, Sunday school classes, and social functions. The school operated until 1960, while the second floor was used for events through the 1990s. The school is one of the only rural one-room schoolhouses remaining in Schuyler County.

The school was added to the National Register of Historic Places on February 5, 2003.

References

School buildings completed in 1874
1870s architecture in the United States
Buildings and structures in Schuyler County, Illinois
Clubhouses on the National Register of Historic Places in Illinois
Grange buildings on the National Register of Historic Places
National Register of Historic Places in Schuyler County, Illinois
School buildings on the National Register of Historic Places in Illinois
Schools in Schuyler County, Illinois